Juhani Kangas (born 27 April 1998) is a Finnish professional footballer who plays for RoPS, as a goalkeeper.

References

1998 births
Living people
Finnish footballers
FC Santa Claus players
Rovaniemen Palloseura players
Veikkausliiga players
Kakkonen players
Association football goalkeepers